Tulehu is a village in Salahutu, Central Maluku Regency, Maluku, Indonesia.

Residents of Tulehu and surrounding areas speak the Tulehu language, which differs slightly in dialect from one village to the next.

Sport
Despite its small size Tulehu is known to be the birthplace of several famous Indonesian footballers. Footballers who come from Tulehu include Hendra Bayauw, Hasyim Kipuw, Ramdani Lestaluhu, Alfin Tuasalamony, and Imran Nahumarury. The government plans to spend 2 billion Rps in the coming years to further develop Tulehu's talent. So strong is the passion for football in Tulehu that all economically stable residents must donate a ball every year to the local organization so that all the children will have a chance to practice.

In film
The 2014 Indonesian film Cahaya Dari Timur: Beta Maluku was based on a book called Jalan Lain ke Tulehu (other way to Tulehu). Both the book and film deal with the Maluku sectarian conflict and aftermath, with the book being written by a journalist who was trapped in Tulehu while it was happening. The film is about the events and details how football suffered during the conflict but also helped rebuild afterwards. Most of the scenes and actors from Cahaya Dari Timur: Beta Maluku are from Tulehu.

Culture and Religion

All of the residents of Tulehu are Muslim with Islam playing a prominent role in public and private life. The Mesjid Jelu Tulehu is the biggest mosque and building in the village.

References

'

Tulehu
Tulehu